The 1974 France rugby union tour of Brazil and Argentina was a series of rugby union team matches played in June 1974 by the France national team in Argentina and Brasil.

Touring party

 Manager: Laurent, Marcel
 Coach: Henri Foures, Jean Desclaux

Forward 
 Pierre Dospital,  – Prop, Dax
 Jean Iracabal – Prop, Bayonne
 Armand Vaquerin – Prop, Béziers
 Alain Paco, hooker Béziers
 Jean Loius Ugartemendia, hooker(St. Jean de Luz)
 Jean-Pierre Bastiat, lock, Béziers
 Alain Esteve, lock Béziers.
 Francis Haget, lock Agen
 Jean Claude Rossignol, Prop, Brive
 Cristian Paùl, flanker, Tarbes.
 Victor Boffelli, flanker, Agen.
 Serge Lassoujade, flanker, Agen.
 Olivier Saisset, flanker Béziers.
 Jean-Claude Skrela, flanker, Stade toulousain

Half 
 Max Barrau, scrum half, Agen.
 Jacques Fouroux, scrum half, La Voulte
 Henri Cabrol, fly-half, Béziers.
 Jean-Pierre Romeu, fly-half, Montferrand

Three-quarters 
 Roland Bertranne, Roland	– center, Bagneres.
 Claude Dourthe center, Dax
 Jean-Martin Etchenique, center, Biarritz
 Jean-Pierre Lux – center/wing Dax, Dax
 Joel Pecune, center, Tarbes.
 Laurent Desnoyers, Laurent, wing, Brive
 Jean-Francois Gourdon, wing, Racing Club de France
 Jean-Miguel Aguirre, full-back, Bagneres
 Michel Droitecourt, full-back, Montferrand

Match details
Complete list of matches played in Argentina and Brazil:
 Points scoring rules: try 4 points, conversion 2 points, penalty goal, drop goal and goal from a mark 3 points

France: 15.M.Droitecourt; 14.J.F. Gourdon, 13.R.Bertranne, 12.J.Lux, 11.L.Desnoyer; 10.J.Romeu, 9.M.Barrau (c); 7.J.Skrela, 8.O.Saisset, 6.V.Boffelli; 5.G.Senal, 4.F.Haget; 3.J.Iracabal, 2.J.Ugartemendia, 1.P.Hospital

 San Isidro Club: F. Insúa; O, Rocha, A. Orzábal; J. Rodríguez Jurado, A. Anthony; J. Carracedo, R. Lucke, M. Iglesias (capt.); M. Cutler, F. González Victorica; R. Morganti, R. Matarazzo (79' E.Martínez), M. Walther, J, Otaola; A. Rodríguez Jurado.
France:   J. Irazabal, A. Paco, A. Vaquerin; J. Bastiat, G. Senal; V. Boffelli, C. Paul (J.Rossignol); O. Saisset  (capt.); D. Fouroux, H. Cabrol; J. Pecune, R. Bertranne (C. Dourthe), J. Lux, J. Gourdon; J. Aguirre. 

Cuyo: J. González, J. Crivelli, R. Fariello; A. Cat¬taneo, R. Irañeta (capt.); J. Ragazzone, J. Nasazzi, J. Navesi; L. Chacón, P. Guarrochena; M. Brandi, O. Terranova, D. Muñiz, C. Dora; J. Castro. 
France:; A. Vaquerin, A. Paco, P. Dospital; J. Rossignol, F. Haget; S. Lassoujade, J. Bastiat, J. Skrela; R. Astre, J. Romeu; J. Pecune (H. Cabrol), C. Dourthe (capt.), J. Etchenique, L. Desnoyers; J. Aguirre. 

Buenos Aires: M.Carluccio, F.Lafuente, O'.Carbone; C, Bottarini (R.García Fernández), J.Rodríguez jurado; J.Carracedo, R.Lucke, N. Carbone (capt.) (O.Rocha); M.Cutler, F.González Victorica; F.Villamil, E.Morgan, A.Cappelletti, R.Benyon; T. Harris Smith, 
France: A.Vaquerin, J.Ugartemendía, P.Dospital; J.Senal, F, Haget; S.Lassoujade, J.Rossignol, V.Boffelli; M. Barrau (capt.), H.Cabrol; R.Bertranne, C.Dourthe, J.Etchenique, L.Desnoyers; M.Droitecourt.

First test 

 Rosario: S.Furno, J.Costante, E.Pavani; J.Mangiamelli, J.Giannone; E.Mainini, M. Cuesta (capt.), V.Macat; R.Castagna, J.Escalante; G.Blanco, R. del Villar, C. Blanco Ansaldi, H.Radiculé; A.Rodríguez.
France:   J.Iracabal, J.Ugartemendía, P, Dospital; J.Bastiat, F.Haget; O.Saisset, C.Paul, S.Lassoujade; M. Barrau (cap.), J.Romeu; L.Desnoyers, J, Etchenique, R.Bertranne, J.Gourdon; J.Aguirre. 

Interior:  J. Pavani (J.Viders), J.Costante, S.Fumo; J.Mangiamelli, R.Passaglia; J.Nasazzi, M. Chesta (capt.) (E.Mainini), J.Navesi; R. Castagna (64' G.Bergallo) J.Escalante; R.Tarquini, O.Terranova, L.Muñiz, C, Dora; L.Chacón 
France:   P. Dospital, J. Ugartemendía, A. Vaquerin; J. Rossignol, G. Sena; S. Lassoujade, C. Paul, O. Saisset (capt.); R. Astre, J. Cabrol; L. Desnoyers, J. Etchenique, J. Lux, J. Gourdon; M.Droitecourt.

Second test

Notes

References 

France tour
Rugby union tours of Argentina
Rugby union tours of Brazil
France national rugby union team tours
1974 in Argentine sport
tour